Ute Steindorf (born 26 August 1957 in Wolfen, East Germany) is a German rower.

References 
 
 

1957 births
Living people
People from Bitterfeld-Wolfen
People from Bezirk Halle
East German female rowers
Sportspeople from Saxony-Anhalt
Olympic rowers of Germany
Rowers at the 1980 Summer Olympics
Olympic gold medalists for East Germany
Olympic medalists in rowing
World Rowing Championships medalists for East Germany
Medalists at the 1980 Summer Olympics
Recipients of the Patriotic Order of Merit in silver